Linda Rottenberg is an American businesswoman and author. She is the author of Crazy Is a Compliment: The Power of Zigging When Everyone Else Zags. She is the CEO and Co-founder of Endeavor, a non-profit organization that encourages the power of entrepreneurship.

Rottenberg was named one of "America's Best Leaders" by U.S. News and one of TIME's 100 "Innovators for the 21st century."  She lectures at Fortune 500 companies. Rottenberg is the subject of four case studies by Harvard Business School and the Stanford Graduate School of Business. ABC and NPR declared her "the entrepreneur whisperer," journalist; Thomas Friedman dubbed her the world's "mentor capitalist," Business Insider named her "Ms. Davos," and she was known as "la chica loca" 
 
She serves on the board of Zayo Group, a global provider of bandwidth infrastructure (NYSE: ZAYO). She is a member of the Inter-American Dialogue, Council on Foreign Relations, and Young Presidents Organization (YPO) and serves on the entrepreneurship steering committee of the World Economic Forum.

Early life and education
Originally from Newton, Massachusetts, Rottenberg received her J.D. from Yale Law School and B.A. magna cum laude in Social Studies from Harvard College, where she was a National Merit Scholar.

Career
Rottenberg co-founded Endeavor, an organization encouraging high-impact entrepreneurs, in 1997. Headquartered in New York with 50 offices across the globe, Endeavor identifies, mentors, and co-invests in individuals with the biggest ideas. After spawning entrepreneurship ecosystems around the world, in 2013 Endeavor started work in the U.S..

Rottenberg has been profiled in the Wall Street Journal, Forbes, The Economist, Financial Times, USA Today, Strategy + Business, People, Glamour, and MORE, and has appeared on GMA, The Today Show, Morning Joe, Nightline, NPR, CNBC, CNN, Fox News, Fox Business, and Bloomberg News. Dell featured her in its "Take Your Own Path" ad campaign and Veuve Clicquot named her Businesswoman of the Year.

Rottenberg also wrote Crazy Is a Compliment: The Power of Zigging When Everyone Else Zags, which was published in 2014.

Personal life
Rottenberg lives in Brooklyn with her husband, author and New York Times columnist Bruce Feiler, and their identical twin daughters.

Honors
 23rd Annual Heinz Award in Technology, the Economy, and Employment (2018)
Named to Forbes "Impact 30" – Forbes
 "Take Your Own Path" campaign winner – Dell
 2009 Asper Award for Global Entrepreneurship 
 One of America's Best Leaders 2008 – U.S. News & World Report
 "Innovator for the 21st Century" – Time Magazine
 "Business Woman of the Year: 2008" – Veuve Clicquot
 One of the top 100 innovators in the world under the age of 35 – MIT Technology Review TR100
 "Global Leader for Tomorrow" and "Young Global Leader" – World Economic Forum
 The 1st female chair of the World Economic Forum on the Middle East (2007) 
 One of the World's Top 40 Social Entrepreneurs – Schwab Foundation for Social Entrepreneurship (2001) 
 10 Women to Watch of 2008 – Running Start
 Person of the Year – Organization of Women in International Trade (2007) 
 The Most Important Not-For-Profit Leader in Latin America – Poder–BCG Business
 Member, Inter-American Dialogue

Notes

References
 Linda Rottenberg's February 2009 Keynote address at Harvard Business School's Social Entrepreneurship Conference 
 Harvard Business School case study (2009): "Endeavor: Creating a Global Movement for High-Impact Entrepreneurship" 
 Harvard Business School case study (2003): "Endeavor: Determining A Growth Strategy" 
 Stanford Graduate School of Business case study 
 "The Davos Awards: The 25 People And Companies Who Just Won The World's Most Prestigious Event" (Business Insider, January 2011)

External links
 Linda Rottenberg's Official Website
 Good Morning America: Entrepreneur Whisperer Helps 3 Moms Scale Up Business (October 2014) 
 MSNBC's The Cycle: Using Your Crazy to Success in Entrepreneurship (October 2014) 
 MSNBC's Morning Joe: How Entrepreneurs Are Responding to the Economy (October 2014) 
 CNBC's Squawk Box: Thinking and Acting Like An Entrepreneur (October 2014) 
 Bloomberg TV: Entrepreneurs Are Risk Minimizers (October 2014) 
 Bloomberg TV: Mentoring Entrepreneurs (October 2014) 
 Fox News: Overcoming the Barriers to Entrepreneurship (July 2014) 
 Video: Stanford University Entrepreneurial Thought Leaders Series (May 2014) 
 Video: 2013 Endeavor Gala Speech (December 2013)
 Entrepreneur Magazine: Can Endeavor Help Struggling Entrepreneurs Abroad and in the U.S.? (November 2013)
 CNBC: Darwinian economics: Why downturns spark start-up booms (November 2013)
 Harvard Business School Case Study: Endeavor - Miami Heats Up (November 2013)

Living people
American women chief executives
American nonprofit chief executives
Harvard College alumni
Yale Law School alumni
Yale University alumni
People from Brooklyn
People from Newton, Massachusetts
Year of birth missing (living people)
21st-century American women
Members of the Inter-American Dialogue